Paul Gilmour (born 10 May 1965) is an Australian sprint canoeist who competed in the late 1980s. He finished fourth in the K-4 1000 m event at the 1988 Summer Olympics in Seoul.

References
Sports-reference.com profile

1965 births
Australian male canoeists
Canoeists at the 1988 Summer Olympics
Living people
Olympic canoeists of Australia
20th-century Australian people